The VRT Zendstation Egem is a  tall guyed mast used as a broadcast antenna. It broadcasts the radio and TV programs of the VRT and  Q-Music, JOE fm, and Nostalgie Vlaanderen. There are also a number of antennas for mobile communications (Base, Mobistar and Proximus ) attached to the mast.

It was built in 1973 and is located in Egem in Pittem, West Flanders, Belgium. It is the tallest structure in Belgium. Since 2008 the tower is owned and operated by Norkring België.

Radio services broadcast from the site (particularly those of the VRT) can be received in parts of neighbouring countries. Reception of the VRT services can regularly be received in the southern provinces of the Netherlands, Nord-Pas-de-Calais in Northern France and Kent in South East England.

Services Broadcast

Analogue Radio (FM)

Digital Radio (DAB)

References

VRT Zendstation Egem at Skyscraperpage

Buildings and structures in West Flanders
Radio masts and towers in Europe
Norkring
Towers in Belgium